The 1933 Duquesne Dukes football team was an American football team that represented Duquesne University as an independent during the 1933 college football season. In its seventh and final season under head coach Elmer Layden, Duquesne compiled a 10–1 record, outscored opponents by a total of 206 to 33, and defeated the Miami Hurricanes in the Festival of Palms Bowl.

Schedule

References

Duquesne
Duquesne Dukes football seasons
Duquesne Dukes football